Platyla foliniana is a species of very small land snail in the family Aciculidae.

Distribution
It is endemic to France, where it is known only from Alpes-Maritimes.

This species lives mainly in moist deciduous forest habitat under leaf litter and ivy. It may also occur in drier habitat with a Mediterranean climate. Little is known about the life history of the species; it is mainly recorded from dead specimens. These have been found at only four locations within a total range of 16 square kilometers. Increasing urbanization in the area may be a threat to the species.

References

 Bank, R. A.; Neubert, E. (2017). Checklist of the land and freshwater Gastropoda of Europe. Last update: July 16th, 2017

External links
 Nevill G. (1879). Description of a new species of Acme and varieties from the conclomerate beds at Menton. Annals and Magazine of Natural History. ser. 5, 4: 341-342
 Boeters, H. D.; Gittenberger, E. & Subai, P. (1989). Die Aciculidae (Mollusca: Gastropoda Prosobranchia). Zoologische Verhandelingen. 252: 1-234. Leiden

Aciculidae
Endemic fauna of Metropolitan France
Gastropods described in 1879
Taxonomy articles created by Polbot